Bear River State Park is a public recreation area straddling the Bear River on the east side of the city of Evanston, Wyoming. The  state park was established in 1991 and is managed by Wyoming Division of State Parks and Historic Sites.

Activities and amenities
The park offers picnicking and a visitors center. Wildlife viewing includes a small herd of captive bison and elk. The park is at the eastern terminus of the Bear River Greenway, a trail system developed by the city that connects the park with downtown Evanston. Trails are used for cross-country skiing in winter. Park events include the annual Bear River Rendezvous held the weekend before Labor Day.

References

External links

Bear River State Park Wyoming State Parks, Historic Sites & Trails
Bear River State Park Brochure & Map Wyoming State Parks, Historic Sites & Trails

Bear River (Great Salt Lake)
Protected areas established in 1991
Protected areas of Uinta County, Wyoming
State parks of Wyoming
Provincial and state parks in the Rocky Mountains
1991 establishments in Wyoming
IUCN Category III